Yelenovka may refer to:

Sevan (city), Armenia
Yelenovka, Azerbaijan

See also
Olenivka (disambiguation)